Luke Young (born 22 February 1993) is an English professional footballer who plays as a midfielder for National League club Wrexham. He was released by Plymouth Argyle in May 2014. Having progressed through the club's youth system, Young made his debut in the Football League in 2011.

Club career

Early life and career
Young was born in Plymouth, Devon. He signed Centre of Excellence forms with Plymouth Argyle in May 2002, aged nine, and played schools football for Plymouth and Devon. In the 2008–09 season, he made 23 appearances for the club's under-18 side, including the full 90 minutes of the FA Youth Cup fifth round tie with Tottenham Hotspur. Despite still being a schoolboy, he also played once for the reserve team. He was a student at Ivybridge Community College before signing a full-time scholarship with the club. Young made a further 22 appearances for the under-18's in the 2009–10 season, scoring one goal, along with seven appearances for the reserves. Having played in 11 matches for the under-18 side the following season, where he scored two goals, and three matches for the reserves, Young was promoted to the first-team squad in January 2011.

Plymouth Argyle
He was an unused substitute in the club's league match at Charlton Athletic on 22 January 2011. Young made his debut one week later against Bournemouth, replacing Northern Ireland international Rory Patterson in the 86th minute. In doing so, he became the 29th player to represent the club in a competitive match during the 2010–11 season. "Rory took a knock, but the boy Young has got good feet. He's a bit slight, but he's a good little footballer," said manager Peter Reid. "I knew Rory was struggling, so I just wanted to have a look at him." He made his first start in a 4–0 defeat at Brighton & Hove Albion on his 18th birthday. Young signed his first professional contract in July, keeping him at the club until the summer of 2012. "Considering that I've been at the club since I was nine, then to get the two-year scholarship and then at the end of that to get the first professional contract that I've been working towards for all these years, is really special," he said on the club's official website. He scored his first goal for Argyle against Torquay United on 2 January 2012.

Young signed a new undisclosed contract in April 2012, along with teammates Curtis Nelson and Jared Sims. He finished the season by winning the club's Young Player of the Year award, having scored twice in 28 appearances.

Torquay United
On 19 June 2014, Young signed for Devon neighbours Torquay United on a two-year deal.

Wrexham
Following Torquay United's relegation to National League South in the 2017–18 season, Young signed for Wrexham on a two-year deal. He made his debut for the club on the opening day of the 2018–19 season during a 1–0 victory over Dover Athletic.
Luke was promoted to club captain for the 2021/22 season.

Career statistics

Honours
Wrexham
FA Trophy runner-up: 2021–22

Individual
Plymouth Argyle Young Player of the Year: 2011–12
Torquay United Player of the Year: 2014–15, 2016–17, 2017–18
Wrexham Player of the Year: 2019–20, 2020–21

References

External links
Luke Young profile at the Torquay United F.C. website

1993 births
Living people
Footballers from Plymouth, Devon
English footballers
Association football midfielders
Plymouth Argyle F.C. players
Torquay United F.C. players
Wrexham A.F.C. players
English Football League players
National League (English football) players